The dislocation of Sámi people was the ordered movement of 300–400 Sámi people from Jukkasjärvi and Karesuando in Sweden in the 1920s to 1940s.

Background
This was outermost a result of political nature between Norway and Russia. Russia wanted the right to keep on fishing in Norwegian fjords but this was denied by Norway. In 1852 Russia answered by cutting off all relationships with Norway, causing regions in Torne Valley (on the Finnish-Russian side) to be excluded from Norwegian Sámi's traditional pasture lands and vice versa. About 400 individuals from Norwegian Kautokeino area then started to change nationality to Swedish and settled in the parish of Karesuando, simply to gain access to previous pasture regions in Finland, since Russia said that Swedish Sámi could enter Finland. This lasted until 1889, when Russia closed the border between Sweden and Finland also for Swedish Sámi.

Dislocation

First movings 
After the pasture in Karesuando became exhausted, which happened very quickly due to many of the families who left Kautokeino had very large herds, some of the original families of Karesuando and some of Kautokeino moved to the parishes of Jukkasjärvi, Gällivare, and Jokkmokk. Among these were Johan Turi.  These first movings was all by their own choice.

Forced relocation
In 1919 Norway and Sweden wrote a new convention about reindeer pasture areas. This led to the four northernmost Sámi villages losing their right to pasture in Norway.  As the herds grew and the situation became worse, the Swedish parliament decided that the number of reindeer in Karesuando should be decreased or else moved.  Most herders refused to cut down their herd and the authorities decided to move some families from Karesuando by force.  In the early 1920s several families and 10,000s of reindeer were moved.  Most of them to Arjeplog and Jokkmokk in south Norrbotten but also to Västerbotten particularly Tärnaby. This relocation is what most people mean when they talk about dislocation by force since those who resisted were threatened by law.

Third wave
In the 1940s a few families moved from Karesuando to Jokkmokk and Norway.  This was all by their own choice.

Consequences
Since the Northern Sámi were different from the Sámi originally living in the areas to which they moved, great controversy emerged.  Most of the conflicts were centered around reindeer herding since the North Sámi were used to other conditions and had different methods of herding. When the authorities intervened, they were unable to solve the problems; however they sided with the North Sámi, claiming that they were more primitive – an opinion possibly based on clear racism.  These conflicts between the original users of the land and the newcomers still divide the Sámi in the area today.

See also
Sámi history
High Arctic relocation
Territorial claims in the Arctic
Political migration
Thule relocation
Environmental racism in Europe

References

Sámi history
Sámi politics
Ethnic cleansing in Europe
Historical migrations
Forced migration
Persecution of Sámi people
Political history of Norway
Racism in Norway
1920s in Norway
1930s in Norway
1940s in Norway